The NAIA Competitive Cheer Championship is an annual meet hosted by the National Association of Intercollegiate Athletics to determine the national champion of collegiate team competitive cheerleading among its members in the United States.

The inaugural meet was held in 2017. Each year, it is held concurrently and at the same venue as the NAIA Competitive Dance Championship. 

The reigning national champions are Xavier Louisiana, who won their first national title in 2022.

Results

Champions

See also
 NAIA Competitive Dance Championship

References

External links
NAIA Competitive Cheer

Competitive cheer